Thayi Devaru is a 1971 Indian Kannada-language drama film written by Shivam and directed by Siddalingaiah. It stars Rajkumar, M. V. Rajamma and Bharathi. The film was released under Jain Movies banner and produced by Chandulal Jain. H. R. Bhargava worked as associate director, M. S. Rajashekar as assistant director and G. K. Venkatesh was the soundtrack and score composer. The dialogues and lyrics were written by Chi. Udaya Shankar. The movie was remade in Telugu in 1973 as Kanna Koduku starring Akkineni Nageswara Rao.

Cast

Soundtrack 
The music of the film was composed by G. K. Venkatesh and lyrics for the soundtrack written by Chi. Udaya Shankar. Venkatesh later reused the song "Haayagide" in Telugu as "Mogindi Veena" for Zamindargari Abbayi and in Tamil as "Then Sinduthe" for Ponnukku Thanga Manasu.

Track list

See also
 Kannada films of 1971

References

External links 
 

1971 films
1970s Kannada-language films
Indian black-and-white films
Indian drama films
Films scored by G. K. Venkatesh
Films directed by Siddalingaiah
1971 drama films
Kannada films remade in other languages